Apollo : A Space Age Childhood is a 2022 American animated coming of age drama film set during the events preceding the Apollo 11 Moon landing, loosely based on the childhood of writer, director, and producer Richard Linklater. It presents a fictional tale of a fourth-grader who becomes the first person to land on the Moon and stars Glen Powell, Jack Black, Zachary Levi and Josh Wiggins. 

Linklater, who originally got the idea for the film in 2004, was planning to create the film in live action but instead decided to go with an animation style influenced by Saturday morning cartoons, due to the playful nature of animation. Home movies created in Houston, Texas during the 1960s were used for research, and some were also included in the film. Principal photography began in February 2020 at Robert Rodriguez's Troublemaker Studios in Austin, Texas, and wrapped in March 2020. Parts of the filming were done in front of the largest green screen in Texas and parts of the film, which were shot in live-action, were animated during post-production using a technique similar to the rotoscoping used in Linklater's Waking Life (2001) and A Scanner Darkly (2006).

Apollo  premiered at South by Southwest on March 13, 2022, and was released in select theaters on March 24, 2022, before premiering on Netflix on April 1. It received positive reviews, with praise for its writing, visuals, and nostalgic feel.

Plot
The film tells the story of the first Moon landing in the summer of 1969 from two interwoven perspectives. It captures both the astronaut and mission control view of the triumphant moment, and the lesser-seen bottom up perspective of what it was like from an excited kid's perspective, living near NASA but mostly watching it on TV like hundreds of millions of others. It's ultimately both an exacting re-creation of this special moment in history and a kid's fantasy about being plucked from his average life in suburbia to secretly train for a covert mission to the Moon.

Voice cast
 Milo Coy as young Stanley
 Jack Black as adult Stanley
 Glen Powell as Bostick, NASA official
 Zachary Levi as Kranz, NASA official
 Josh Wiggins as Steve
 Lee Eddy as Mom
 Bill Wise as Dad
 Natalie L'Amoreaux as Vicky
 Jessica Brynn Cohen as Jana
 Sam Chipman as Greg
 Danielle Guilbot as Stephanie

Production
Richard Linklater originally got the idea for the film in 2004. In February 2018, it was announced Richard Linklater would direct the film from a screenplay he wrote. In July 2020, it was announced Glen Powell, Jack Black,  Zachary Levi, Josh Wiggins, Milo Coy, Lee Eddy, Bill Wise, Natalie L'Amoreaux, Jessica Brynn Cohen, Sam Chipman and Danielle Guilbot had joined the cast of the film, with Netflix distributing.

Richard Linklater was planning to create the film in live action but instead decided to go with an animation style influenced by Saturday morning cartoons because of the playful nature of animation. Home movies created in Houston, Texas during the 1960s were used for research, some were also included in the film.

Principal photography began in February 2020 at Robert Rodriguez's Troublemaker Studios in Austin, Texas, and wrapped in March 2020. Linklater spent much of the time editing the film during the COVID-19 pandemic.

Setting
The film is set in Houston in the 1960s, during the Space Race.

Filming
Parts of the filming were done in front of the largest green screen in Texas, and everything the characters did not interact with or touch was animated in post-production.  Parts of the film, which were shot in live-action, were animated during post-production using a technique similar to the rotoscoping used in Linklater's Waking Life (2001) and A Scanner Darkly (2006). After initially being denied eligibility for the Animated Feature category by the Academy of Motion Picture Arts and Sciences for using the stylized animation approach, their appeal, with support from fellow directors and animators, reversed the decision.

Release
Apollo : A Space Age Childhood premiered as a headliner at the 2022 South by Southwest film festival on March 13, 2022. When the official trailer was released, the release date was announced for April 1, 2022, which is when it premiered on Netflix. The film was screened in select theaters on March 24, 2022.

Reception
Review aggregator website Rotten Tomatoes reports that 91% of 135 sampled critics gave the film a positive review, with an average rating of 8/10. The site's critics consensus reads, "The sweetly nostalgic Apollo 10 1/2: A Space Age Childhood finds Richard Linklater reusing visual and thematic ingredients in a deeply personal, freshly inspired way." On Metacritic, the film has a weighted average score of 79 out of 100 based on 38 critics, indicating "generally favorable reviews."

Apollo 10 1/2 was ranked seventh on Cahiers du Cinémas top 10 films of 2022 list.

Accolades

See also
 Apollo 11 in popular culture

References

External links
 
 

Apollo 11
English-language Netflix original films
American adult animated films
Films about the Apollo program
Films about astronauts
Animated films directed by Richard Linklater
Films set in 1969
Netflix Animation films
Rotoscoped films
2020s American animated films
2022 animated films
2022 drama films
2020s English-language films
American coming-of-age films
American coming-of-age drama films